Niels Vink (born 6 December 2002) is a Dutch wheelchair tennis player. 

At the 2020 Summer Paralympics, Vink won a gold medal with partner Sam Schröder in the Quad Doubles, and a bronze in the Quad Singles.

Early life
At the age of one year, Vink contracted a bacterial infection (meningococcal sepsis). As a result, he lost both legs and several phalanges.

At the age of nine, he attended the 2012 Summer Paralympics in London. This is where his ambition arose to one day participate in the Paralympic Games. After trying out a few sports, he chose wheelchair tennis.

Career statistics

Performance timelines

Current through 2022 US Open.

Quad singles

Grand Slam tournament finals

Quad singles: 5 (2 titles, 3 runner-ups)

Quad doubles: 5 (4 titles, 1 runner-up)

References

External links
 
 
 
  

2002 births
Living people
Dutch male tennis players
Wheelchair tennis players
Paralympic wheelchair tennis players of the Netherlands
Paralympic gold medalists for the Netherlands
Paralympic bronze medalists for the Netherlands
Paralympic medalists in wheelchair tennis
Medalists at the 2020 Summer Paralympics
Wheelchair tennis players at the 2020 Summer Paralympics
Sportspeople from Helmond
ITF number 1 ranked wheelchair tennis players